John Alexander "Jack" Jackson (May 3, 1925 — August 8, 2015) was a Canadian professional ice hockey player who played 48 games in the National Hockey League for the Chicago Black Hawks during the 1946–47 season. He was born in Windsor, Ontario.

Career statistics

Regular season and playoffs

References

External links
 

1925 births
2015 deaths
Canadian ice hockey defencemen
Chicago Blackhawks players
Denver Falcons players
Ice hockey people from Ontario
Kansas City Pla-Mors players
New Haven Eagles players
Seattle Ironmen players
Sportspeople from Windsor, Ontario
Stratford Kroehlers players